Damias quadripuncta is a moth of the family Erebidae first described by Walter Rothschild in 1915. It is found on Seram.

References

Damias
Moths described in 1915